Jaimy Buter  (born 4 March 2002) is a Dutch footballer who plays for Excelsior Rotterdam.

Career
Buter made his professional debut in the Eerste Divisie appearing as a substitute as Excelsior Rotterdam played Jong AZ at Excelsior’s Stadion Woudestein on 20 November 2020. Buter had joined the Academy at Excelsior Rotterdam when he was nine years old. Ten years later in June 2021 he was given a professional contract until 2023. Buter commented that he took pride in the fact so many youth products had developed together at Excelsior and so many of his childhood friends, such as Joshua Eijgenraam, and Delano Gouda were training and playing together in the first team.

References

External links
 

Living people
2002 births
Excelsior Rotterdam players
Dutch footballers
Eredivisie players
Eerste Divisie players